Pusulpitiya is a village in Sri Lanka. It is located within Central Province.

See also
Pusulpitiya Raja Maha Vihara
List of towns in Central Province, Sri Lanka

External links

Populated places in Nuwara Eliya District